Modlitba may refer to:

 "Modlitba" (Katarína Hasprová song), 1998
 Martin Modlitba (born 1970), a Slovak gymnast

See also
 "Molitva", a 2007 song